Evans High School may refer to:

Evans High School (Georgia) — Evans, Georgia
Evans High School (Louisiana) — Vernon Parish, Louisiana
Evans High School (New South Wales) — Blacktown, New South Wales
Maynard Evans High School — Orlando, Florida